The Power Macintosh 7100 is a personal computer that was designed, manufactured and sold by  Apple Computer from March 1994 to January 1996. It is the mid-range machine of the first generation of Power Macintosh line, between the Power Macintosh 6100 and the 8100. The 7100 re-used the Macintosh IIvx case with few changes. The initial version of the 7100 was powered by a  PowerPC 601, and an  version replaced it in January 1995. 
The 7100 was succeeded in August 1995 by two new models, the Power Macintosh 7200 and the Power Macintosh 7500, though sales of the 7100 continued into early 1996.

Models
The 7100AV variants include a 2 MB VRAM card with S-Video in/out. The non-AV 7100s have a video card containing 1 MB VRAM which was expandable to 2 MB, and no S-Video in/out capability.

Apple did not release a "DOS Compatible" card for the 7100 as they had for some contemporary Macintosh Quadra models, opting instead to offer the 7100 bundled with the SoftWindows emulator at a price of $385.  With an optional 256KB L2 cache card installed, MacWorld Magazine determined that the performance is comparable to 25 MHz Intel 80486SX.

Introduced March 14, 1994:
 Power Macintosh 7100/66: No L2 cache. $2,650 USD.
 Power Macintosh 7100/66AV: $3,450.

Introduced January 3, 1995:
 Power Macintosh 7100/80: 256KB L2 cache.
 Power Macintosh 7100/80AV

Codename lawsuits
The Power Macintosh 7100's internal code name was "Carl Sagan, one of the three "fraud" code names (Pilt Down Man, Cold Fusion, and Carl Sagan) referring to the PowerPC processor pretending to be a 68000. Though the project name was internal, it was revealed to the public in a 1993 issue of MacWeek. Sagan, worried that the public might interpret this as an endorsement which sullied his name, reportedly contacted Apple and threatened to sue unless they could prove the codename did not officially link to his intellectual property and identity. After they reportedly refused, he wrote a letter to the editor that appeared in a 1994 issue of MacWeek, seeking to inform their readers of the situation.

Following the letter, a rogue programmer at Apple renamed the project to "BHA (for Butt-Head Astronomer). Sagan then sued Apple for libel over the new name, but since the new codename was a expression of opinion, not fact, he lost his case. Sagan continued pursuing lawsuits. When he sued Apple again, this time for the original use of his name, he lost this suit as well. Sagan and Apple, apparently not wishing to engage in a series of lawsuits over the issue, came to an out-of-court agreement in November 1995, leading to Apple making a statement of apology. The engineers on the project made a third and final name change from "BHA" to "LAW", short for "Lawyers are Wimps".

Timeline

References

External links

 apple-history.com :: Power Macintosh 7100

7100
7100
Macintosh desktops
Computer-related introductions in 1994